The 1933 Texas Tech Matadors football team Texas Technological College—now known as Texas Tech University—as a member of the Border Conference during the 1933 college football season. In their fourth season under head coach Pete Cawthon, the Matadors compiled an 8–1 record (1–0 against conference opponents) and outscored opponents by a combined total of 144 to 30. The team played its home games at Tech Field.

Schedule

References

Texas Tech
Texas Tech Red Raiders football seasons
Texas Tech Matadors football